Wilmer Gardner Crowell (January 29, 1884 – August 23, 1943) was an American college football, basketball and lacrosse player and coach. He was a quarterback and drop kicker at Swarthmore. He served as the head football coach at George Washington University in 1906 and at Lafayette College form 1914 to 1916, compiling a career coaching record of 19–15–5. Crowell died on August 23, 1943, at Chestnut Hill Hospital in Philadelphia, Pennsylvania.

Crowell was the head referee during the 1936 NFL Championship Game.

Head coaching record

References

External links
 Sports-Reference profile

1884 births
1943 deaths
American football quarterbacks
Basketball coaches from Pennsylvania
National Football League officials
George Washington Colonials football coaches
Lafayette Leopards athletic directors
Lafayette Leopards football coaches
Lafayette Leopards men's basketball coaches
Players of American football from Philadelphia
Swarthmore Garnet Tide football coaches
Swarthmore Garnet Tide football players
Swarthmore Garnet Tide men's lacrosse coaches
High school football coaches in Pennsylvania
Sportspeople from Philadelphia
American football drop kickers